Marvak may refer to:

Marvak, Lorestan
Marvak, South Khorasan